Jerzy Makarczyk (born 1938) is a Polish lawyer.

Makarczyk represented Poland in the European Court of Human Rights (1999–2002). He was appointed as a judge from Poland to the European Court of Justice on 11 May 2004 and served until 2009.

See also

List of members of the European Court of Justice

References

European Court of Justice judges
20th-century Polish judges
Living people
1938 births
Polish judges of international courts and tribunals
Presidents of the International Law Association
21st-century Polish judges